Antorcha (meaning Torch in English) was a newspaper published from Las Palmas, Spain, briefly between 1935 and 1936.

History and profile
Antorcha was founded, as a fortnightly publication in 1935. The newspaper was mainly theoretical in its nature. Antorcha was published by the Manual and Intellectual Workers Syndicate of the Confederación Nacional del Trabajo (CNT).

At the time of the outbreak of the Spanish Civil War in July 1936, publication stopped. Antorcha would later appear as a clandestine organ during the 1940s.

References

1935 establishments in Spain
1936 disestablishments in Spain
Anarchist newspapers
Confederación Nacional del Trabajo
Defunct newspapers published in Spain
History of the Canary Islands
Mass media in Las Palmas
Newspapers established in 1935
Publications disestablished in 1936
Spanish-language newspapers